Leo Čizmić (born December 17, 1998) is an Israeli-born Croatian professional basketball player who plays for Bàsquet Girona of the LEB Plata.

Career 
The son of former basketball player Teo Čizmić, who was a member of the Yugoslavian junior national team and played professionally in a number of European countries, he was born in Israel, where his father was playing at the time.

Čizmić came through the youth ranks of KK Split and headed to Spain in 2014 to join Baloncesto Sevilla. He played for the club’s youth team and for their second men’s team, before making his debut in Spain’s top-tier Liga ACB in the 2015-16 season. He would then flit between Sevilla’s ACB squad and their affiliate teams.

Čizmić moved to Araberri of the Spanish second-tier LEB Oro for the 2017-18 season.

International career 
He was a member of the Croatian national team that participated in the 2014 FIBA Europe Under-16 Championship and the 2016 FIBA Europe Under-18 Championship.

References

External links 
 ACB profile

1998 births
Living people
Araberri BC players
Real Betis Baloncesto players
Croatian expatriate basketball people in Spain
Croatian men's basketball players
Liga ACB players
People from Afula
Small forwards